Barbara Dulcie Lott (15 May 1920 – 19 December 2002) was a British actress probably best remembered as Ronnie Corbett's character's mother, Phyllis Lumsden in the BBC television sitcom Sorry!. She also appeared in Coronation Street, Rings on Their Fingers, Survivors, Z-Cars and as Rona's auntie Pearl in the BBC television sitcom 2point4 Children, amongst others.

Lott was born on 15 May 1920 in Richmond upon Thames, Surrey. Her father, William Lott, was an executive at Ealing Studios and Lott appeared in small roles in films as a child. She studied acting at the Royal Academy of Dramatic Art, graduating in 1937 and joining repertory theatre. In 1940, she married Stuart Latham, who was later a producer of Coronation Street. Lott eventually made her London stage debut in Love for Love at the Haymarket Theatre in 1944. Her first television appearance was as Viola in Twelfth Night in 1950 and she went on to appear frequently on television in small roles. In 1978, she was cast in her first major role in Rings on Their Fingers, in 1981 in Sorry! and in 1992 in an occasional role in 2point4 Children. She appeared in several films, most notably as Ewan McGregor’s mother in The Pillow Book. She died on 19 December 2002 in London, aged 82.

Television roles

Selected filmography
 Let's Be Famous (1939) - Sophie the telephonist (uncredited)
 Three Silent Men (1940) - Nurse
 Brighton Rock (1948) - (uncredited)
 Dilemma (1962) - Nun
 The World Ten Times Over (1963) - Bob's PA (uncredited)
 The Party's Over (1965) - Almoner
 Unman, Wittering and Zigo (1971) - Mrs. Winstanley
 Electric Moon (1992) - Mrs. Ellis
 The Pillow Book (1996) - Jerome's Mother

References

External links

English television actresses
1920 births
2002 deaths
20th-century British businesspeople